is a Japanese voice actor from Fukuyama, Hiroshima. He is affiliated with Office Osawa. He graduated from Department of Voice Acting Talent of Amusement Media Academy.
 His major roles include Kakeru Naruse in Orange, Takahiro Mizuno in Walkure Romanze, Buntarō Hōjō  in Girls Beyond the Wasteland, and Rekka Yukimura in Battle Spirits: Burning Soul.

Filmography

Television animation
2013
Aikatsu! as Male
Arpeggio of Blue Steel as Student C
Ore no Imōto ga Konna ni Kawaii Wake ga Nai. as Staff member A (ep 10)
Sunday Without God as  Student (ep 7), Teserick (eps 10, 12)
A Certain Scientific Railgun S as Anti-Skill B (ep 13), Bullied Man (ep 12), Thief (ep 18)
White Album 2 as Deliveryman (ep 9)
Walkure Romanze as Takahiro Mizuno
Stella Women's Academy, High School Division Class C³ as College student B (ep 10)
2014
Amagi Brilliant Park as Nick 
M3 the dark metal as Policeman A, Commandment
Wolf Girl and Black Prince as Junya Ōno 
Gaist Crusher as Barry member
If Her Flag Breaks as Student A, Male student, Seite ikoujita kamori
Golden Time as Nakagawa
Jewelpet Happiness as Schoolboy 2
Soul Eater Not! as Clay
Celestial Method as Student
Nagi-Asu: A Lull in the Sea as Jin Iimori (ep 14), Hama Junior High student A (ep 16)
Lord Marksman and Vanadis as Follower (ep 1), Soldier, Patrolman (ep 3), Hoplite (ep 5), Officer (ep 9), Aide (ep 10)
The Irregular at Magic High School as Terrorist
Encouragement of Climb 2nd Season as Announcer (ep 4), Firefly ghost (ep 13), Kenichi Kuraue (youth; ep 6), Mountain climber (ep 11), Mountain climber A (ep 10), Mountain hut person (ep 9), Mūma-kun (eps 1-2, 20, 24), Official (ep 21), Student (ep 15), Student B (ep 12), Taishi (ep 19), TV voice (ep 7)
Lady Jewelpet as Prince Soarer, Police officer
Wizard Barristers as Crime Lab Technician (ep 7)
2015
Go! Princess PreCure as Firefighter
Battle Spirits: Burning Soul as Yukimura Rekka
Is It Wrong to Try to Pick Up Girls in a Dungeon? as Adventurer B
Food Wars: Shokugeki no Soma as Male student B (ep 8), Male student C (ep 3), Schoolboy A (ep 22), Spectator C (ep 23), Staff C (ep 12)
Ultimate Otaku Teacher as Mamoru
Akagami no Shirayukihime as Official, Soldier B
Shimoneta as Underwear Thief A
Gate: Jieitai Kano Chi nite, Kaku Tatakaeri as Lancer, SDF personnel
Comet Lucifer as Guard, Soldier
Seraph of the End: Battle in Nagoya as Eita Kusunoki
Mobile Suit Gundam: Iron-Blooded Orphans as Masahiro Altland, Tekkadan member
2016
Girls Beyond the Wasteland as Buntarō Hōjō
Haruchika as Keisuke Katagiri
Orange as Kakeru Naruse
Touken Ranbu: Hanamaru as Yagen Tōshirō, Aizen Kunitoshi
Mob Psycho 100 as Mameta Inukawa, Sagawa
Whistle! as Yoshihiko Koga (voice remake)
2017
Idol Time PriPara as Shougo Yumekawa
Katsugeki/Touken Ranbu as Yagen Tōshirō
Hitorijime My Hero as Jirō Yoshida
A Centaur's Life as Takamichi Koma
Tsurezure Children as Chiaki Uchimura
Eromanga Sensei as Chris Yamada
2018
How to Keep a Mummy as Daichi Tachiaki
Butlers: Chitose Momotose Monogatari as Daichi Kurosawa
Lost Song as Henry Leobort
Touken Ranbu: Hanamaru 2 as Yagen Tōshirō, Aizen Kunitoshi
2019
The Case Files of Lord El-Melloi II: Rail Zeppelin Grace Note as Svin Glascheit
Case File nº221: Kabukicho as James Moriarty
Stand My Heroes: Piece of Truth as Aki Kagura
2020
My Roomie Is a Dino as Shōta
Appare-Ranman! as Kosame Isshiki
2021
Suppose a Kid from the Last Dungeon Boonies Moved to a Starter Town as Allan Twein Lidcain
Horimiya as Toru Ishikawa
86 as Raiden Shuga
My Hero Academia Season 5 as Geten
The Vampire Dies in No Time as Kantarō Kei
Rumble Garanndoll as Hosomichi Kudō
2022
Aoashi as Sōichirō Tachibana
The Eminence in Shadow as Cid Kagenou / Shadow
More Than a Married Couple, But Not Lovers as Jirō Yakuin
Play It Cool, Guys as Kida
My Hero Academia Season 6 as Geten
2023
Flaglia as Kanchi
The Ancient Magus' Bride Season 2 as Rian Scrimgeour
Insomniacs After School as Tao Ukegawa

Theatrical animation
Gekijōban Kyōkai no Kanata I'll Be Here (2015) as Ikaishi
The Anthem of the Heart (2015) as Nishikori
Harmony (2015)
Orange: Future (2016) as Kakeru Naruse
Black Butler: Book of the Atlantic (2017) as Edward Midford
Happy-Go-Lucky Days (2020) as Yagasaki-kun
Eien no 831 (2022) as Donki

Original net animation (ONA)
Ore no Imōto ga Konna ni Kawaii Wake ga Nai. (2013) as Passerby
Jinryoku Senkan!? Shiokaze Sawakaze (2017) as Shinpei Hoshi
Kakegurui Twin (2022) as Aoi Mibuomi

Drama CD
Like a Butterfly as Schoolboy
Overlord as Tōkeru
Ninja Slayer as Jade Sword
Kyouichi-kun to no Isshou as Kyouichi
Yōkoso seiyū ryō e! 201-Gōshitsu ~ hōgen seiyū ~ as Sōta Narumi

Video games
2013
Hakkenden: Eight Dogs of the East as Sosuke Inukawa
2014
Oreshika: Tainted Bloodlines as Ikadzuchimaru, Asuka Ōtori
Gundam Breaker 2 as Ruslan
NAtURAL DOCtRINE as Nebula
Freedom Wars as Billy "Leopard" Koller
Koe kare ~ hōkago kimi ni ai ni iku ~ as Kaname Shitara
2015
Atelier Sophie: The Alchemist of the Mysterious Book as Oskar Behlmer
Touken Ranbu as Yagen Tōshirō, Aizen Kunitoshi
Yume ōkoku to nemureru 100-ri no ōji-sama as Kalt
2016
Girls Beyond the Wasteland as Buntarō Hōjō 
2017
 Akane-sasu Sekai de Kimi to Utau as Hiraga Gennai
2020
 Disney: Twisted-Wonderland as Ace Trappola

Dubbing
Pilgrimage (Brother Diarmuid (Tom Holland))

References

External links
  
 

1992 births
Living people
Male voice actors from Hiroshima Prefecture
Japanese male video game actors
Japanese male voice actors